The discography of Skylar Grey (formerly Holly Brook), an American singer-songwriter consists of four studio albums, seven extended plays (EPs), 21 singles (including nine as a featured artist) and 14 music videos. Grey was signed to Machine Shop Recordings under the name Holly Brook. She released her debut album Like Blood Like Honey in 2006, but was released from her contract after it did not perform commercially. She began working under the name Skylar Grey in 2010, co-writing the three versions of "Love the Way You Lie" with Alex da Kid, who signed her to his Wonderland Music (now KidinaKorner) label. Grey later left KIDinaKORNER/Interscope records and is currently an independent artist.

Studio albums

EPs

Singles

As lead artist

As featured artist

Promotional singles

Other charted songs

Guest appearances

Songwriting and production credits

Music videos

As lead artist

As featured artist

Notes

References

Discographies of American artists